The Runway Awareness and Advisory System (RAAS) is an electronic detection system manufactured by Honeywell Aerospace, that notifies aircraft flight crews on the ground of their position relative to their allocated runway.

Overview

According to Honeywell, who developed RAAS, runway incursions are a leading cause of aviation accidents and fatalities, costing approximately $1 billion annually.

RAAS functions by providing audible alerts to confirm runway identification, and also provides an aural alarm if it detects undue acceleration (indicating an attempt to take off) while the aircraft is on any taxiway instead of a designated runway.  Its function is possible by a software enhancement to the aircraft's terrain awareness and warning system (TAWS) or enhanced ground proximity warning system (EGPWS).

Entrance into service
Alaska Airlines announced in September 2008 that its entire airline fleet of Boeing 737s will be equipped with RAAS by the end of September.  That will be the first airline fleet to be completely equipped with this system. Ryanair was the first European airline to introduce RAAS. In 2016 Ryanair committed to equip all its fleet with RAAS, which was mostly complete by 2019.

References

External links
 The Safety Impact of RAAS

Avionics
Runway safety
Airport infrastructure